The Nishnabotna River Bridge is a Warren Pony truss bridge located southwest of Henderson, Iowa, United States. The Warren Pony truss bridge was designed by engineers at the Iowa State Highway Commission in the summer of 1929. It was built by McCormack Construction Company of Lohrville, Iowa for $30,900, and completed in 1930. The bridge is made up of two skewed trusses that are supported by concrete abutments and piers. It was listed on the National Register of Historic Places in 1998.

References

Bridges completed in 1930
Buildings and structures in Mills County, Iowa
Road bridges on the National Register of Historic Places in Iowa
Truss bridges in Iowa
National Register of Historic Places in Mills County, Iowa
Warren truss bridges in the United States